Gerard Aafjes (born 27 January 1985) is a retired Dutch football defender who played for Quick Boys in the 4th tier of Dutch football, the Hoofdklasse.

Club career
Aafjes was born in Mijdrecht and joined FC Volendam in 2004. He later signed a two-year deal with Falkirk in 2007, where he scored once against Inverness Caledonian Thistle. He joined MVV in the summer of 2009, signing a deal that will keep him with the club until 2011.

On 1 October 2013 Aafjes signed a contract with Danish club Vejle Boldklub. He came to the club on a free transfer. The contract runs out in 2013. In summer 2014, Aafjes returned to Holland to play for fourth-tier Quick Boys.

References

External links

1985 births
Living people
People from De Ronde Venen
Association football defenders
Dutch footballers
Eredivisie players
Eerste Divisie players
Scottish Premier League players
MVV Maastricht players
FC Volendam players
Falkirk F.C. players
PEC Zwolle players
Vejle Boldklub players
Quick Boys players
Dutch expatriate footballers
Expatriate footballers in Scotland
Expatriate men's footballers in Denmark
Dutch expatriate sportspeople in Scotland
Dutch expatriate sportspeople in Denmark
Footballers from Utrecht (province)
21st-century Dutch people